Sloan House may refer to:

Sloan House (Prescott, Arizona). listed on the NRHP in Prescott, Arizona
Sloan-Raymond-Fitch House, Wilton, Connecticut
William B. Sloan House, Chicago, Illinois, built in 1910, designed by Walter Burley Griffin
Sloan House, Glenview, Illinois, the first house known as a solar house, designed by George Fred Keck
Dempster-Sloan House, Geneva, Nebraska, listed on the NRHP in Fillmore County, Nebraska
Samuel Sloan House, Hightstown, New Jersey, listed on the NRHP in Mercer County, New Jersey
Sloan Cottage, Saranac Lake, New York
George B. Sloan Estate, Oswego, New York, listed on the NRHP in Oswego County, New York
Dr. David Dickson Sloan Farm, Garland, North Carolina, listed on the NRHP in Sampson County, North Carolina
Dr. Earl S. Sloan House, Trent Woods, North Carolina, listed on the NRHP in Craven County, North Carolina
Sloan-Throneburg Farm, Chesterfield, North Carolina, listed on the NRHP in Burke County, North Carolina
Rush R. Sloane House, Sandusky, Ohio, listed on the NRHP in Sandusky, Ohio
John Sloan Homestead, Volin, South Dakota, listed on the NRHP in Yankton County, South Dakota
Sloan–Parker House, Junction, West Virginia
William P. Sloan House, Waukesha, Wisconsin, listed on the NRHP in Waukesha County, Wisconsin

See also
Sloane House (disambiguation)